Euoplocyon is an extinct genus of  the Borophaginae subfamily of canids native to North America. A member of the Borophagini tribe, it was an intermediate-sized canid, with specialisations towards a heavily meat-based diet.

Species
E. brachygnathus (syn. Aelurodon brachygnathus, E. praedator) Douglass 1903, discovered at the Flint Creek Beds, a Miocene terrestrial horizon in Montana.
E. spissidens (syn. Aelurocyon spissidens, Enhydrocyon spissidens) White 1947, discovered at the Alachua Formation, Alachua County, Florida.

References

 Flynn, J.J., 1998. Early Cenozoic Carnivora ("Miacoidea"). pp. 110–123 in C.M. Janis, K.M. Scott, and L.L. Jacobs (eds.) Evolution of Tertiary Mammals of North America. Volume 1: Terrestrial Carnivores, Ungulates, and Ungulatelike Mammals. Cambridge University Press, Cambridge. 

Extinct mammals of North America
Borophagines
Prehistoric carnivoran genera